Stéphan Guérin-Tillié (Reims, 20 June 1972) is a French actor, director, and screen writer. He is most known for his role in Just a Question of Love (Juste une question d'amour). Guérin-Tillié has directed the films Edy (with a soundtrack by Nils Petter Molvær), Requiem(s), and J'ai fait des sandwichs pour la route, and acted in a number of films and television roles.

Work

Filmography

Writing

Directing

References

External links
 Official site of Stéphan Guérin-Tillié 
 

French film directors
French male screenwriters
French screenwriters
Living people
1972 births
Actors from Reims
French male film actors
French male television actors
Cours Florent alumni
Mass media people from Reims